The following is a list of pipeline accidents in the United States in 1975. It is one of several lists of U.S. pipeline accidents. See also: list of natural gas and oil production accidents in the United States.

Incidents 

This is not a complete list of all pipeline accidents. For natural gas alone, the Pipeline and Hazardous Materials Safety Administration (PHMSA), a United States Department of Transportation agency, has collected data on more than 3,200 accidents deemed serious or significant since 1987.

A "significant incident" results in any of the following consequences:
 Fatality or injury requiring in-patient hospitalization.
 $50,000 or more in total costs, measured in 1984 dollars.
 Liquid releases of five or more barrels (42 US gal/barrel).
 Releases resulting in an unintentional fire or explosion.

PHMSA and the National Transportation Safety Board (NTSB) post-incident data and results of investigations into accidents involving pipelines that carry a variety of products, including natural gas, oil, diesel fuel, gasoline, kerosene, jet fuel, carbon dioxide, and other substances. Occasionally pipelines are re-purposed to carry different products.

The following incidents occurred during 1975:
 1975 A Mid-Valley Pipeline crude oil pipeline at Lima, Ohio, ruptured after a valve was accidentally closed against a pumping pipeline, on January 17. The spraying crude oil ignited, killing a Terminal Operator.
 1975 On January 23, a propane chiller at a MAPCO facility exploded violently during maintenance work on it, near Iowa City, Iowa. 2 workers were killed and 3 others injured by the failure.
 1975 A gas transmission pipeline exploded and gas burned in Mediapolis, Iowa on January 27. There were no injuries reported.
 1975 In March, a leak was discovered in a 14-inch petroleum products pipeline in Mecklenburg County, North Carolina. Plantation Pipeline began efforts to recover the spilled petroleum. From that time through June 1983, approximately 2,022 barrels of spilled petroleum products were recovered from standpipes at the leak site. Remediation efforts stopped in October 1984. Later tests raised questions on the possibility of not all of the spill products were recovered.
 1975 A 12-inch crude oil pipeline ruptured near Harwood, Missouri, on March 26. Heavy rain slowed the cleanup.
 1975 A natural gas liquids (NGL) pipeline ruptured due to previous mechanical damage, at Devers, Texas. The escaping vapor cloud drifted across US Highway 90, where a passing automobile ignited the vapor. 4 people were killed in a following vapor cloud fire. The pipeline had been damaged when a valve was installed on the pipeline. (May 12, 1975)
 1975 An explosion in June 1975 at a home in East Stroudsburg, Pennsylvania, was caused by natural gas leaking into the home from an open main in the middle of the street. One person was killed. In 1973, workers hired by the gas company had falsified records showing the main had been closed.
 1975 On June 11, a leaking pipeline for the Alyeska Pipeline Service Company was found to have spilled about 60,000 gallons of crude oil at a construction camp in Alaska. That pipeline had been noticed leaking before, but, previous repair efforts had failed.
 1975 An LPG pipeline ruptured near Romulus, Michigan, due to previous mechanical damage to the pipeline, and over pressurization from operator error, caused by closing a valve against a pumping pipeline, at a storage facility. Nine people were injured in the following vapor cloud fire. (August 2, 1975)
 1975 An ammonia pipeline ruptured in Texas City, Texas on September 3. 47 people needed medical treatment for ammonia exposure.
 1975 On September 7, a gas gathering pipeline failed due to internal and external corrosion near Kilgore, Texas. Unodorized natural gas liquids from the leak were ignited by an automobile, killing 5 people.
 1975 On September 19, flooding along the Amite River in Louisiana caused a 12-inch propane pipeline to break, releasing about 743,000 gallons of propane.
 1975 On October 13, employees at a gas processing plant at Goldsmith, Texas heard leak gas, and investigated. Before the leak could be found, a 12-inch pipeline there exploded, killing 3 of the crew, injuring 2 others, and causing extensive plant damage.
 1975 On December 18, a failed pressure relief device caused cracks in storage tanks supporting the Trans-Alaskan Pipeline System, leaking about 600,000 gallons of crude oil in Prudhoe Bay, Alaska.

References

Lists of pipeline accidents in the United States
pipeline accidents
1975 in the environment
1975 in the United States